Maurizio Bevilacqua  (born June 1, 1960) is a Canadian politician who was mayor of Vaughan from 2010 to 2022. He was a Liberal member of Parliament (MP) from 1988 to 2010 and was one of eleven candidates for the 2006 leadership contest, but dropped out of the race on August 14, 2006. He has been described in the media as a "right-of-centre, business friendly Liberal".

He resigned his seat in the House of Commons of Canada and announced on September 3, 2010, that he would be a candidate for mayor of Vaughan. On October 25 he was elected mayor.

Early life
Born in Sulmona, Italy, he arrived in Canada in 1970 at the age of 10. As a youth, he attended Emery Collegiate and received a Bachelor of Arts from York University. He is also a graduate of Fordham University- The Jesuit University of New York City where he earned his Master of Arts degree. He has two children, Jean-Paul and Victoria.

Politics
He first got involved in party politics by working as a staffer for Sergio Marchi, and would later participate in student politics at York University.

Initially elected in the 1988 election, he defeated the Progressive Conservative candidate by only 77 votes.  Due to the closeness of the race, the results were voided by the courts, and a by-election was called for 1990.

Bevilacqua won the 1990 by-election of York North by over 7,000 votes, despite a strong effort by the New Democratic Party.

Bevilacqua  represented the districts of York North (1988–1997), Vaughan—King—Aurora (1997–2004) and Vaughan (2004–2010). He is a former secretary of state (Science, Research and Development) and (International Financial Institutions). He is also a former parliamentary secretary to the minister of Labour (Human Resources Development) and to the Minister of Employment and Immigration (Human Resources Development). He was formerly a consultant.

He was the longtime chair of the Commons finance committee. While a fiscal conservative, Bevilacqua has supported same-sex marriage.

2006 Liberal leadership bid
On April 19, 2006, he declared his candidacy for the leadership of the Liberal Party, joining Martha Hall Findlay, Michael Ignatieff, and Stéphane Dion as official entrants into the leadership race. His supporters included MPs Gerry Byrne and Roy Cullen, former Cabinet minister Roy MacLaren and former party pollster Michael Marzolini. He also attracted the support of former Chrétien organizers Tennio Evangelista, Jeff Angel and Jeff Smith. His campaign for the Liberal Party leadership was not successful and he dropped out of the race on August 14, 2006 to support fellow Liberal Party leadership candidate Bob Rae.

Mayor of Vaughan
Bevilacqua officially announced in early September 2010 that he was running in the 2010 Vaughan municipal election for the position of mayor. The announcement came shortly after his resignation as Member of Parliament for Vaughan.

He defeated controversial incumbent Linda Jackson, the former mayor who was still facing charges from election finance irregularities stemming from her 2006 mayoral victory.

Bevilacqua was re-elected mayor of Vaughan in 2014 and again in 2018, both times with greater than seventy percent of the vote.

On June 1, 2022 Bevilacqua announced he would not be seeking re-election in the 2022 election and subsequently endorsed Steven Del Duca to succeed him.

References

External links
 Official site
 How'd They Vote?: Maurizio Bevilacqua's voting history and quotes

1960 births
Italian emigrants to Canada
Liberal Party of Canada MPs
Living people
Members of the 26th Canadian Ministry
Members of the House of Commons of Canada from Ontario
Members of the King's Privy Council for Canada
People from Sulmona
Liberal Party of Canada leadership candidates
York University alumni
Mayors of Vaughan